Notoscopelus caudispinosus is a species of lanternfish in the family Myctophidae. It is found in the eastern and western Atlantic Ocean, the Indian Ocean and parts of the Pacific Ocean. It spends the day below , rising towards the surface to feed at night.

Description
The mouth is at the tip of the rounded snout and extends backwards to just behind the eye. The teeth are small. There are 24 to 27 soft rays in the dorsal fin, 19 to 21 in the anal fin and 11 to 13 in the pectoral fins. There are groups of photophores (small light organs) on the head and sides of the body. Above the caudal peduncle there is a row of eight to nine luminous scale-like segments in adult males, but male fish lack luminous organs above the eye and on the cheek. N. caudispinosus differs from closely related species in having fewer than 15 gill rakers.

Distribution
This species has a wide oceanic distribution in deep water habitats. It is found in the eastern Atlantic Ocean between the equator and about 35°N, but is absent from the Gulf of Guinea and the upswelling region off the coast of Mauritania. It is also present in the western Atlantic, between about 39°S and 41°N, in the Caribbean Sea and the Gulf of Mexico, and in parts of the Indian and Pacific Oceans.

Status
N. caudispinosus faces no particular threats and has a widespread distribution, so the International Union for Conservation of Nature has rated it as being a least-concern species.

References

Myctophidae
Fish described in 1863
Taxa named by James Yate Johnson
Fish of the Atlantic Ocean
Fish of the Indian Ocean
Fish of the Pacific Ocean